Dead Grandma  is a 10-episode comedy Web series created by Will Kindrick. It is written by Kindrick, Courtney Branning, Matt Heder and is produced by Mummy Space Island Productions.  The series follows the life of a hapless young college student Andy (Matt Heder), whose grandma (Beverly Welsh) comes back from the dead to help him find love. The series is hosted by Jon Heder who begins each episode with a campy intro reminiscent of the openings of nostalgic shows such as Masterpiece Theater and The Wonderful World of Disney.

Each episode follows a two-act structure split up by the opening title sequence and theme song.  The series is often abruptly interrupted by parody commercial breaks. A PSA starring a Dead Grandma cast member is also featured after the end credits of every episode.

Production 

Dead Grandma combines live action with an animated sky and cloud background. The production took place over the course of two weekends in March & April 2010. Filming locations included Art Center College of Design, Pasadena City College, Cafe 50's, Big Mama's Rib Shack and various locations in Pasadena and Studio City. The series was mentored by television and film director Jeremiah Chechick.

Inspiration 

The writers often referred to the protagonist Andy as a self-deprecating Charlie Brown-type character from Peanuts since he is consistently bullied and fails and nearly everything he attempts. The tone of the series was heavily influenced by 1990s sitcoms such as Family Matters, Full House, Saved by the Bell, The Wonder Years, and The Simpsons.

Setting 

Dead Grandma takes place in the fictional city of Notpasadena where Andy and his classmates attend the shady Notpasadena Community College.

Characters 

Main Characters

 Series Host (Jon Heder)
 Andy (Matt Heder)
 Dead Grandma (Beverly Welsh)
 Judy (Shannon Mary Dixon)
 Meathead (Nicholas Zaharias)
 Wiseguy #1 (Chase Bingham)
 Wiseguy #2 (Will Kindrick)
 Fabrizio (Umberto Riva)

Reoccurring Characters
 Professor Hoskins (Michael Coady)
 Mr Flugelmen (Don Lucas)
 Stoner (Tony Hello)
 Gus Gus (Conner Dean)
 Mean Nerd (Erin Pearce)
 The Fabrizihoes

Episodes

Reception 

Reviews

The Knife Fight praised the show as being "one of the more polished creations on the web today, boasting high production value as well as a hilariously original concept." The trailer currently has a 92% rating on Funny or Die.

Awards & nominations

Soundtrack

Original Score 

The score was written and performed by Garrick Hargrove and heavily features ukulele, chimes and shakers. The theme song melody is often revisited and reprised throughout the score. Several other original songs were written for specific episodes including "Delicious Creamy Sweets" written & performed by Ben Lazarus and "Super Exciting Pirate Adventure Explosion the Move 2" written & performed by Amos Watene, Aaron Watene, Matt Heder, Will Kindrick and Ryan Augustine.

Theme Song 

The theme song pays homage to classic campy 1950's-60's television series. The song was written by Will Kindrick and performed, arranged and recorded by the Brea California based a cappella group, "Soundstage".

Benefit Show 

A benefit fundraiser concert was held July 30, 2010 on the roof top of the Fox Theater in Pomona CA to raise proceeds for the series. The show featured musical acts GOGO13, Digital Unicorn and Eyes Lips Eyes.

References

External links 
 
 

American comedy web series